A Hopeless Case is a 1939 German comedy film directed by Erich Engel and starring Jenny Jugo, Karl Ludwig Diehl and Hannes Stelzer.

The film's sets were designed by Karl Weber.

Synopsis
A determined female medical student at Berlin University resists the advances of her professor, single-mindedly concentrating on her chosen profession. She then sails to Argentina with her true love, fellow student who the Professor has arranged to be sent there to try and get out of the way.

Cast
 Jenny Jugo as Jenny
 Karl Ludwig Diehl as Professor Dr. Bruchsal
 Hannes Stelzer as Hans Faber
 Leo Peukert as Jennys Vater
 Axel von Ambesser as  Verehrer
 Heinz Salfner as Diener
 Theodor Danegger as Gotthelf Matthias
 Josefine Dora as Emma Matthias
 Hans Richter as Student
 Erik Ode as Student
 Julia Serda
 Frida Richard
 Gustav Waldau
 Werner Pledath

Trivia 
On 14 March 1939, Adolf Hitler summoned Emil Hácha, President of Czechoslovakia to Berlin for talks. The meeting was scheduled late at night and was to include, apart from Hitler,  Hermann Göring and Joachim von Ribbentrop. The elderly Hácha was humiliated by being deliberately kept waiting for hours, because Hitler was at that time watching the film A Hopeless Case, which ended past midnight. He was summoned by Hitler at 1:15 AM, who informed him that German troops would march into Czechoslovakia at 6:00 AM, on the pretext that the Czechs were disturbing the peace in Europe. In the antechamber, Göring and Ribbentrop pressed Hácha to sign a document legalizing the invasion. When Hácha hesitated, Göring threatened to bomb Prague, whereupon Hácha fainted. Revived by injection, Hácha signed a document in the presence of Hitler accepting the invasion and annexation of Czech lands into the Third Reich, which began in the early morning of 15 March 1939.

References

Bibliography

External links 
 

1939 films
1939 comedy films
German comedy films
Films of Nazi Germany
1930s German-language films
Films directed by Erich Engel
Films set in Berlin
Films set in universities and colleges
German black-and-white films
1930s German films